The Southern–New Orleans Knights and Lady Knights are the athletic teams that represent Southern University at New Orleans, located in New Orleans, Louisiana, in intercollegiate sports as a member of the National Association of Intercollegiate Athletics (NAIA), primarily competing in the Gulf Coast Athletic Conference (GCAC) since the 2022–23 academic year; which they were a member on a previous stint from 1986–87 to 2018–19 (their final season before the school suspended its athletics program and eventually re-instating it back).

The university has garnered over 150 NAIA All-American honors in its athletic programs.

Return 
On January 20, 2022, SUNO re-instated its athletic program and received an invitation to re-join back to the GCAC, along with Oakwood University (from the United States Collegiate Athletic Association (USCAA)) and Wiley College, effective beginning in July 2022.

Varsity teams
SUNO competes in five intercollegiate varsity sports: Men's sports included basketball and track & field; while women's sports included basketball, track & field and volleyball.

Basketball

Men's basketball
The Southern–New Orleans Knights men's basketball team represents Southern University at New Orleans in New Orleans, Louisiana, United States. The school's team currently competes in the Gulf Coast Athletic Conference, which is part of the National Association of Intercollegiate Athletics. The team plays its home games at 1,200-seat Health and Physical Education Building also known as "The Castle".

SUNO's men basketball teams have appeared in six NAIA tournaments.

Women's basketball
The Southern–New Orleans Lady Knights women's basketball team represents Southern University at New Orleans in New Orleans, Louisiana, United States. The school's team currently competes in the Gulf Coast Athletic Conference, which is part of the National Association of Intercollegiate Athletics. The team plays its home games at 1,200-seat Health and Physical Education Building also known as "The Castle".

The women's basketball team has appeared in one NAIA Tournament.

Men's and women's track and field
The Southern–New Orleans Knights and Lady Knights  track and field teams represents Southern University at New Orleans in New Orleans, Louisiana, United States. The school's teams currently compete in outdoor track and field in the Gulf Coast Athletic Conference, which is part of the National Association of Intercollegiate Athletics.

The men's track & field team placed 2nd in nation at the NCAA Division III outdoor championships in 1974 and at the NAIA outdoor national outdoor championships in 1998.

Former head coach Dr. Artis Davenport was named NAIA Women's Indoor and Outdoor as well as Men's Outdoor Track & Field Coach of the Year in 1995. He earned the same honor in 1997 for Indoor Track & Field. The track and field team garnered 6 NAIA All-American honors at the NAIA 2008 Indoor Track & Field Championships.

Two Olympians have competed in SUNO's Track & Field Program. They include Savatheda Fynes (Bahamas) and Julius Achon (Uganda).

Women's volleyball
The Southern–New Orleans Lady Knights women's volleyball team represents Southern University at New Orleans in New Orleans, Louisiana, United States. The school's team currently competes in the Gulf Coast Athletic Conference, which is part of the National Association of Intercollegiate Athletics. The team plays its home games at 1,200-seat Health and Physical Education Building also known as "The Castle".

Championships
Southern–New Orleans holds five national championships between NCAA Division III and NAIA.

Facilities
The Health and Physical Education Building, nicknamed The Castle, is the 1,200-seat arena for the men's and women's basketball teams and volleyball team. It opened in 1974.

See also
 Gulf Coast Athletic Conference
 National Association of Intercollegiate Athletics

References

External links
 Official website